{{Infobox settlement
| native_name       = 
| native_name_lang  = sr
| official_name     = Arilje
| other_name        = 
| settlement_type   = Town and municipality
| image_shield      = COA Arilje.gif
| image_flag        = 
| image_skyline     = 
| image_caption     = Clockwise, from top: Panorama of Arilje, town center promenade, 13th century Saint Achillius Church| image_map         = Municipalities of Serbia Arilje.png
| map_caption       = Location of the municipality of Arilje within Serbia
| mapsize           = 
| coordinates       = 
| subdivision_type        = Country
| subdivision_name        = 
| subdivision_type1       = Region
| subdivision_name1       = Šumadija and Western Serbia
| subdivision_type2       = District
| subdivision_name2       = Zlatibor
| established_title  = 
| established_date   = 
| established_title1 = Town status
| established_date1  = 1880
| founder            = Milan Obrenović IV
| parts_type        = Settlements
| parts_style       = para
| p1                = 22
| leader_party      = SNS
| leader_title      = Mayor
| leader_name       = Predrag Maslar
| leader_title1     = 
| leader_name1      = 
| area_blank1_title = Town
| area_blank1_km2   = 3.94
| area_blank2_title = Municipality
| area_blank2_km2   = 349.06
| area_footnotes    = 
| elevation_m       = 350
| elevation_min_m   = 
| elevation_max_m   = 1328
| population_footnotes = 
| population_as_of  = 2011 census
| population_blank1_title = Town
| population_blank1 = 6763
| population_density_blank1_km2 = auto
| population_blank2_title = Municipality
| population_blank2 = 18792
| population_density_blank2_km2 = auto
| timezone          = CET
| utc_offset        = +1
| timezone_DST      = CEST
| utc_offset_DST    = +2
| postal_code_type  = Postal code
| postal_code       = 31230
| blank_name        = Car plates
| blank_info        = UE
| area_code         = +381(0)31
| area_code_type    = Area code
| website           = 
}}
Arilje is a town and municipality located in the Zlatibor District of southwestern Serbia. The population of the town is 6,763, while the municipality has 18,792 inhabitants. The town is famous for having large raspberry plantations in which many locals are employed.

Geography
The municipality of Arilje is located in western Serbia in the river basins of the clear mountain rivers of the Rzav and Moravica. It has a hilly-mountainous area at an altitude of 330 to 1,382 meters.

The municipality seat is situated at the confluence of the Rzav and Moravica rivers in a region described by many as a heavenly earth. There is numerous material evidence of continuous life in this region, from the prehistoric to contemporary time. There are many interesting facts associated to this place as well. The residents of Thessaly found refuge here in the 11th century, and with great trust they laid the relics of their St. Achileus into the existing temple. The town was named after this saint, and his cult is celebrated to this day as a people's holiday and patron saint of Arilje.

Climate
Arilje has a humid continental climate (Köppen climate classification: Dfb), that's very close to an oceanic climate (Köppen climate classification: Cfb'').

History
In 1219 Sava Nemanjić proclaimed the Arilje monastery the seat of the Moravica episcopate that covered the territory of Arilje, Užice, Valjevo and Čačak. The first Serbian Orthodox Archbishop and later Metropolitan held court here. In 1296 king Dragutin Nemanjić erected his own memorial, a beautiful church, also called St. Achileus, and for over seven centuries it has been the symbol and pride of Arilje, as well as the center of spiritual gathering for the people of this region.

There are several churches and monasteries in this municipality. The Klisura monastery, 13 km away from Arilje, on the road to Ivanjica, is among the best known. It is dedicated to the archangels Michael and Gabriel, and was destroyed and reconstructed several times during its turbulent history. Today it is a convent. The oldest secular buildings preserved to this day are the house of colonel Jovan Mićić from 1823 and the old school founded in 1834.

In 1880, by decree of prince Milan Obrenović, Arilje was awarded the status of town.

King Milan Obrenović declared Arilje a municipality in 1882.

Settlements
Aside from the town of Arilje, the municipality includes the following settlements:

 Bjeluša
 Bogojevići
 Brekovo
 Cerova
 Dobrače
 Dragojevac
 Grdovići
 Grivska
 Kruščica
 Latvica
 Mirosaljci
 Pogled
 Radobuđa
 Radoševo
 Severovo
 Stupčevići
 Trešnjevica
 Vigošte
 Virovo
 Visoka
 Vrane

Demographics

According to the 2011 census results, the municipality of Arilje has a population of 18,792 inhabitants.

Ethnic groups
The ethnic composition of the municipality:

Economy
In the village of Visoka, 34 km from Arilje, there is a spa where water springs in the river bed. The water temperature is 28C, and it is said that it cures skeletal diseases, heart problems, nerves and considerably improves the eyesight. Between the villages of Brekovo and Dobrače, at the spring of the river Panjica, is the entrance to the Vodena pećina (Water Cave), and its numerous secrets have not yet been completely examined.

The restaurant Mllinarev San was built near the downtown on the bank of the Rzav River. There are numerous secluded beaches on the banks of the Rzav such as Bosa Noga, Urjak and Žuta stena. There is an abundance of pure and high quality water. The clear mountain streams and creeks cut through the whole municipality and are suitable for water supplying, fish production and are a considerable power supply potential. The quality of the spring water is so good that there are possibilities for bottling at numerous springs in the municipality. The river Rzav provides drinking water to five cities in Serbia.

The municipality of Arilje has become a real epicenter in the raspberry production in recent years. The whole population in the municipality is virtually involved in the raspberry production. Over 5,000 of these small production plants in the open produce over 20 million kilograms of raspberries and provide considerable annual hard currency income. The largest concentration of raspberry plants and the biggest fruit refrigerating chamber (Zemljoradnička zadruga Arilje) are in Arilje. The biggest individual record in raspberry production has been achieved here (44,763 kg per hectare).  The raspberry has revitalized the villages of Arilje, and the people of Arilje have erected a monument to honor it. The agronomist who taught them how to grow raspberries became better known as a writer. This is why the people of Arilje are proud to announce that Dobrilo Nenadić, the author of several novels and winner of distinguished awards, lives and works in Arilje.

The raspberry production is not the only economy feature of this region. There are over 1,300 active private businesses and companies in this area (there is 1 business or shop per 15 people). This says a lot on the entrepreneurship and hard work of the people of Arilje. With slight cynicism they say they owe their success to the state which didn't show much concern to the development of this area, and did not have time to build any business giants during the social realistic industrial wave. There was no social peace buying and the people of Arilje were left to themselves, relying on their innate self-preservation instinct, and they rolled up their sleeves, got to work and created a very powerful business center here.

As a successful municipality, Arilje strides forward by recognizing progressive areas and is not lulled by the things it has achieved. The municipality has passed the Strategy of economic development of the Arilje municipality 2006-2015 because it realized that the economic development must be strategically planned and directed. The document was drawn within the project sponsored by USAID, pursuant to the World Bank methodology. The local team, consisting of representatives of the public, business and civil sector analyzed the present state and defined the directions of future development. One of the strategic goals of our municipality is the advancement of agricultural production and processing in accordance with the standards. In order to realize this, the municipality planned to invest into the following activities:
 Modernization and strengthening of agricultural homesteads and farmer education
 Technology advancement in fruit and other cultures production and processing
 Standardization of the agricultural production
 Support to farmer and processor societies
 Rational resource management.

Economic preview
As of 2012, Arilje has a total of 4,793 registered agricultural entities (farmsteads).

The following table gives a preview of total number of registered people employed in legal entities per their core activity (as of 2018):

Society and culture
Classical music festival "Arlemm" is held annually in the municipality of Arilje.

ARLEMM is a classical music summer school as well as a cultural and educational manifestation organized by the MUZIKUS and takes place in Arilje every summer in July (since 2009), which brings together the most eminent artists, professors and lecturers from different artistic fields: classical, spiritual, traditional, jazz music, as well as people of creative skills, with the idea that, primarily to children and young people, and then to all levels of one community, brings closer to the cultural values of humanities.

http://arlemm.rs

Sport
There are various sport clubs based in Arilje, of which the most representative are FK Budućnost football club, KK Klik basketball club and RK Arilje handball club.

Gallery

Notes

External links

 Municipality of Arilje
 Arilje Community

Populated places in Zlatibor District
Municipalities and cities of Šumadija and Western Serbia